The seventh season of the American reality series Bar Rescue premiered on March 1, 2020 and ended on September 13, 2020 on Paramount Network.

Experts

Jon Taffer – Host/Star/Bar Consultant

Chefs

Jason Santos

Mixologists

Mia Mastroianni
Emily DeLicce
Ashley Clark
Derrick Turner
Alex Goode
Amy Koffsky
Tommy Palmer

Other experts

Episodes

External links

 
 Bar Rescue Updates — Unaffiliated site that keeps track of bars being open or closed and has updates for each bar

2020 American television seasons
Bar Rescue